Zelig is a 1983 American mockumentary film written, directed by and starring Woody Allen as Leonard Zelig, a nondescript enigma, who, apparently out of his desire to fit in and be liked, unwittingly takes on the characteristics of strong personalities around him. The film, presented as a documentary, recounts his period of intense celebrity during the 1920s, including analyses by contemporary intellectuals.

The film received critical acclaim and was nominated for numerous awards, including the Academy Awards for Best Cinematography and Costume Design.

Style 
Zelig was photographed and narrated in the style of 1920s black-and-white newsreels, which are interwoven with archival footage from the era and re-enactments of real historical events. Color segments from the present day include interviews of real cultural figures, such as Saul Bellow and Susan Sontag, and fictional ones.

Plot 
Set in the 1920s and 1930s, the film concerns Leonard Zelig (Woody Allen), a nondescript man who has the ability to transform his behavior and demeanor to that of the people who surround him. He is first observed at a party by F. Scott Fitzgerald, who notes that Zelig related to the affluent guests in a refined Boston accent and shared their Republican sympathies, but while in the kitchen with the servants, he adopted a coarser tone and seemed to be more of a Democrat. He soon gains international fame as a "human chameleon".

Interviewed in one of the witness shots, psychologist Bruno Bettelheim makes the following comment:

Dr. Eudora Fletcher (Mia Farrow) is a psychiatrist who wants to help Zelig with this strange disorder when he is admitted to her hospital. Through the use of hypnotism, she discovers Zelig yearns for approval so strongly that he physically changes to fit in with those around him. Dr. Fletcher eventually cures Zelig of his compulsion to assimilate, but goes too far in the other direction; for a brief period he is so intolerant of others' opinions that he gets into a brawl over whether or not it is a nice day.

Dr. Fletcher realizes that she is falling in love with Zelig. Because of the media coverage of the case, both patient and doctor become part of the popular culture of their time. However, fame is the main cause of their division. Numerous women claim that he married and impregnated them, causing a public scandal. The same society that made Zelig a hero destroys him.

Zelig's illness returns, and he tries to fit in once more, before he disappears. Dr. Fletcher finds him in Germany working with the Nazis before the outbreak of World War II. Together they escape, as Zelig uses his ability to imitate one more time, mimicking Fletcher's piloting skills and flying them back home across the Atlantic upside down. They eventually return to America, where they are proclaimed heroes and marry to live full happy lives.

Cast 

Susan Sontag, Irving Howe, Saul Bellow, Bricktop, Dr. Bruno Bettelheim and Professor John Morton Blum appear as themselves.

Production 
Allen used newsreel footage, and inserted himself and other actors into it, using bluescreen technology. To provide an authentic look to his scenes, Allen and cinematographer Gordon Willis used a variety of techniques, including locating some of the antique film cameras and lenses used during the eras depicted in the film, and simulating damage, such as crinkles and scratches, on the negatives to make the finished product look more like vintage footage. The virtually seamless blending of old and new footage was achieved almost a decade before digital filmmaking technology made such techniques much easier to accomplish, as seen in films such as Forrest Gump (1994) and various television advertisements.

The film uses cameo appearances by real figures from academia and other fields for comic effect. Contrasting the film's vintage black-and-white film footage, these persons appear in color segments as themselves, commenting in the present day on the Zelig phenomenon as if it really happened. They include essayist Susan Sontag, psychoanalyst Bruno Bettelheim, Nobel Prize-winning novelist Saul Bellow, political writer Irving Howe, historian John Morton Blum, and the Paris nightclub owner Bricktop.

Also appearing in the film's vintage footage are Charles Lindbergh, Al Capone, Clara Bow, William Randolph Hearst, Marion Davies, Charlie Chaplin, Josephine Baker, Fanny Brice, Carole Lombard, Dolores del Río, Adolf Hitler, Joseph Goebbels, Hermann Göring, James Cagney, Jimmy Walker, Lou Gehrig, Babe Ruth, Adolphe Menjou, Claire Windsor, Tom Mix, Marie Dressler, Bobby Jones, and Pope Pius XI.

In the time it took to complete the film's special effects, Allen filmed A Midsummer Night's Sex Comedy and Broadway Danny Rose. This is Orion Pictures' last film to be released through Warner Bros.

Release 
Before being shown at the Venice Film Festival, the film opened on six screens in the US and grossed US$60,119 on its opening weekend; it eventually earned US$11.8 million in North America.

Critical reaction 
Zelig has a 97% rating on the review aggregator Rotten Tomatoes based on 31 reviews, with an average score of 8/10. The site's consensus reads: "Wryly amusing, technically impressive, and ultimately thought-provoking, Zelig represents Woody Allen in complete command of his craft".

In his review in The New York Times, Vincent Canby observed:

Variety said the film was "consistently funny, though more academic than boulevardier", and The Christian Science Monitor called it "amazingly funny and poignant". Time Out described it as "a strong contender for Allen's most fascinating film", while TV Guide said, "Allen's ongoing struggles with psychoanalysis and his Jewish identity – stridently literal preoccupations in most of his work – are for once rendered allegorically. The result is deeply satisfying". Gene Siskel gave the film two stars out of four, calling it "a beautifully made but slight fable." Pauline Kael wrote that when the film was over "I felt good, but I was still a little hungry for a movie. There's a reason 'Zelig' seems small; there aren't any characters in it, not even Zelig."

Colin Greenland reviewed Zelig for Imagine magazine, and stated that "Woody Allen's most irresistable film for quite a while. He has found a new way to make fun of his own neuroses without exposing us to the egoism which became so overbearing in Manhattan or Stardust Memories."

It ranked 588th among critics, and 546th among directors, in the 2012 Sight & Sound polls of the greatest films ever made. Chris Nashawaty of Entertainment Weekly listed the work as one of Allen's finest, lauding it as "a spot-on homage to vintage newsreels and a seamless exercise in technique." The Daily Telegraph film critics Robbie Collin and Tim Robey also named it as a career highlight and argued, "The special effects, in which Allen is seamlessly inserted into vintage newsreels, are still astonishing, and draw out the aching tragicomedy of Zelig's plight. He's the original man who wasn't there." Calum Marsh of Slant magazine wrote, "We are infinitely pliable. That's the thesis of Zelig, Allen's wisest film, which has much to say about the way a person can be bent and contorted in the name of acceptance. Its ostensibly wacky conceit ... is grounded in an emotional and psychological reality all too familiar to shrug off as farce. We'll go very far out of our way to avoid conflict. Zelig seizes on that weakness and forces us to recognize it."

Awards and nominations 

 56th Academy Awards
 Academy Award for Best Cinematography (Gordon Willis, nominee)
 Academy Award for Best Costume Design (Santo Loquasto, nominee)
 37th British Academy Film Awards
 BAFTA Award for Best Original Screenplay (nominee)
 BAFTA Award for Best Cinematography (nominee)
 BAFTA Award for Best Special Visual Effects (nominee)
 BAFTA Award for Best Editing (nominee)
 BAFTA Award for Best Makeup (nominee)
 Writers Guild of America Award for Best Comedy Written Directly for the Screen (nominee)
 National Society of Film Critics Award for Best Cinematography (Gordon Willis, nominee)

 41st Golden Globe Awards
 Golden Globe Award for Best Motion Picture - Musical or Comedy (nominee)
 Golden Globe Award for Best Actor - Motion Picture Musical or Comedy (Woody Allen, nominee)
 Saturn Award for Best Direction (nominee)
 New York Film Critics Circle Award for Best Cinematography (winner)
 Kansas City Film Critics Circle Award for Best Supporting Actress (Mia Farrow, winner; tied with Linda Hunt for The Year of Living Dangerously)
 Belgian Film Critics Association: Grand Prix (winner)
 David di Donatello Award for Best Foreign Actor (Allen, winner)
 Venice Film Festival Pasinetti Award for Best Film (winner)
 Bodil Award for Best Non-European Film (winner)

Soundtrack
 Leonard the Lizard (1983) - Composed by Dick Hyman - Sung by Bernie Kuce, Steve Clayton and Tony Wells
 Doin' the Chameleon (1983) - Composed by Dick Hyman - Sung by Bernie Kuce, Steve Clayton and Tony Wells
 Chameleon Days (1983) - Composed by Dick Hyman - Performed by Mae Questel
 You May Be Six People, But I Love You (1983) - Composed by Dick Hyman - Sung by Bernie Kuce, Steve Clayton and Tony Wells
 Reptile Eyes (1983) - Composed by Dick Hyman - Sung by Rose Marie Jun
 The Changing Man Concerto (1983) - Composed by Dick Hyman
 I've Got a Feeling I'm Falling (1929) - Music by Fats Waller (as Thomas 'Fats' Waller) and Harry Link - Sung by Roz Harris
 I'm Sitting on Top of the World (1925) - Music by Ray Henderson - Sung by Norman Brooks
 Ain't We Got Fun (1921) - Music by Richard A. Whiting - Performed by The Charleston City All Stars
 Sunny Side Up (1929) - Music and Lyrics by Ray Henderson, Lew Brown and Buddy G. DeSylva - Performed by The Charleston City All Stars
 I'll Get By (1928) - Music by Fred E. Ahlert - Performed by The Ben Bernie Orchestra
 I Love My Baby, My Baby Loves Me (1925) - Music by Harry Warren - Performed by The Charleston City All Stars
 Runnin' Wild (1922) - Music by A.H. Gibbs - Performed by The Charleston City All Stars
 A Sailboat in the Moonlight (1937) - Written by Carmen Lombardo and John Jacob Loeb (as John Loeb) - Performed by The Guy Lombardo Orchestra
 Charleston (1923) - Music by James P. Johnson - Performed by Dick Hyman
 Chicago (That Toddlin' Town)(1922) - Written by Fred Fisher - Performed by Dick Hyman
 Five Feet Two, Eyes of Blue (1925) - Music by Ray Henderson - Performed by Dick Hyman
 Anchors Aweigh (1906) - Music by Charles A. Zimmerman - Modified by Domenico Savino (1950) - Performed by Dick Hyman
 Take Me Out to the Ballgame (1908) - Music by Albert von Tilzer 
 The Internationale (1888) - Music by Pierre De Geyter

See also 
 Environmental dependency syndrome
 The Belonging Kind
 The Pretender (TV series)

References

Bibliography

External links 

 
 
 

1983 films
American fantasy comedy films
American independent films
American satirical films
American black-and-white films
1980s fantasy comedy films
1980s English-language films
Films directed by Woody Allen
Films set in the 1920s
Films set in 1928
Films set in 1929
Films set in the 1930s
Films set in 1930
Films set in 1931
Films set in 1932
Films set in New York City
Films shot in New Jersey
Great Depression films
American mockumentary films
Orion Pictures films
Films with screenplays by Woody Allen
Films produced by Robert Greenhut
Cultural depictions of Charles Lindbergh
Cultural depictions of Charlie Chaplin
Cultural depictions of Al Capone
Cultural depictions of William Randolph Hearst
Cultural depictions of Josephine Baker
Cultural depictions of Adolf Hitler
Cultural depictions of Hermann Göring
Cultural depictions of James Cagney
Cultural depictions of Babe Ruth
1983 comedy films
1980s American films